Stars in My Crown is a Jorma Kaukonen studio album released in 2007 on Red House Records. Kaukonen returned to songwriting with this album, and again incorporated the work of several contributing musicians including Barry Mitterhoff, who had been playing mandolin with Hot Tuna since 2002. The album made it to the Billboard charts for "Top Heatseekers" peaking at #37.

Track listing
"Overture: Heart Temporary" (Jorma Kaukonen) – 5:12
"Fur Peace Rag" (Kaukonen) – 3:00
"By the Rivers of Babylon" (Brent Dowe, Trevor McNaughton) – 4:54
"Living in the Moment" (Kaukonen) – 3:56
"Late Breaking News" (Kaukonen) – 3:03
"Come Back Baby" (Lightning Hopkins) – 5:47
"Mighty Hard Pleasure" (Joe Croker) – 3:31
"No Demon" (Byron House) – 3:06
"There's a Table Sitting in Heaven" (Rev. Gary Davis) – 3:54
"The Man Comes Around" (Johnny Cash) – 4:03
"A Life Well Lived" (Kaukonen) – 4:00
"Will There Be Any Stars in My Crown?" (John R. Sweney, Eliza E. Hewitt) – 3:55
"Preacher Picked the Guitar" (Roy Book Binder) – 3:08
"Instrumental Reprise: Will There Be Any Stars in My Crown?" (Sweney, Hewitt, arranged by Davis, Ernie Hawkins) – 1:03

Personnel
Heart Temporary
Jorma Kaukonen – vocals, acoustic guitar
Barry Mitterhoff – bouzouki
Byron House – upright bass
Andrea Zonn, Conni Ellisor, David Angell, Mary Kathryn VanOsdale, Pamela Sixfin – violins
Chris Farrell, James Grosjean, Kristin Wilkinson, Monisa Angell – violas
John Catchings, Kirsten Cassel – cellos
Fur Peace Rag
Jorma Kaukonen – acoustic guitar
Barry Mitterhoff – mandolin
Byron House – upright bass
Jim Hoke – clarinet
By the Rivers of Babylon
Jorma Kaukonen – lead vocals, acoustic guitar
Barry Mitterhoff – mandolin
Byron House – upright bass
Chris Brown – drums, percussion
Ed Gerhard – weissenborn
Fred Eltringham – cowbell, guiro, shaker
Phil Madeira – organ
Ann McCray, Gale West – support vocals
Henry House, Lily Mitterhoff, Maya Mitterhoff, Tessa Mitterhoff, Truman House – children's support vocals
Living in the Moment
Jorma Kaukonen – acoustic guitar
Barry Mitterhoff – mandolin
Byron House – upright bass
Chris Brown – drums, percussion
Ed Gerhard – acoustic guitar
Sally Van Meter – resonator guitar
Late Breaking News
Jorma Kaukonen – vocals, acoustic guitar
Barry Mitterhoff – mandolin
Byron House – upright bass
Chris Brown – drums, percussion
Ed Gerhard – weissenborn
Jim Hoke – soprano saxophone
Sally Van Meter – resonator guitar
Come Back Baby
Jorma Kaukonen – vocals, acoustic guitar
Barry Mitterhoff – mandolin
Byron House – upright bass
Jelly Roll Johnson – harmonica
Mighty Hard Pleasure
Jorma Kaukonen – vocals
Ed Gerhard – acoustic guitar
Greg Leisz – pedal steel guitar
Phil Madeira – organ
No Demon
Jorma Kaukonen – vocals
Barry Mitterhoff – mandolin
Byron House – upright bass
Reese Wynans – upright piano
Sally Van Meter – resonator guitar
Tim Stafford – acoustic guitar
There's a Table Sitting in Heaven
Jorma Kaukonen – lead vocals, acoustic guitar
Barry Mitterhoff – tenor banjo
Byron House – upright bass, bass support vocal
Jelly Roll Johnson – harmonica
Sally Van Meter – resonator guitar, high tenor support vocal
Tim Stafford – acoustic guitar, high baritone support vocal
The Man Comes Around
Jorma Kaukonen – vocals, acoustic guitar
Byron House – upright bass
Greg Leisz – electric guitar
Jason Burleson – 5-string banjo
Rob Ickes – resonator guitar
Shawn Lane – mandolin
Tim Stafford – acoustic guitar
A Life Well Lived
Jorma Kaukonen – acoustic guitar
Barry Mitterhoff – mandolin, tenor banjo
Byron House – upright bass
Chris Brown – drums, percussion
Fats Kaplin – pedal steel guitar
Jelly Roll Johnson – harmonica
Reese Wynans – upright piano
Will There Be Any Stars in My Crown?
Jorma Kaukonen – lead vocals, acoustic guitar
Barry Mitterhoff – mandolin
Byron House – upright bass
Chris Brown – drums, percussion
Fred Eltringham – tambourine
Reese Wynans – upright piano
Sally Van Meter – resonator guitar
Ann McCrary, Gale West – support vocals
Calvin Settles – tenor support vocal
Odessa Settles – alto support vocal
Shirley Settles – soprano support vocal
Ted Settles – bass support vocal
Preacher Picked the Guitar
Jorma Kaukonen – vocals, acoustic guitar
Will There Be Any Stars in My Crown? (instrumental)
Jorma Kaukonen – acoustic guitar

Production
Byron House – producer
Gary Paczosa – recordist, engineer
Recorded in Nashville at 17 Grand, Sound Emporium and Minutia
Mixed in Nashville at Minutia
Additional recording by Ed Cash at Ed's in Franklin, TN; Phil Madeira at Planet of the Tapes in Brentwood, TN; Kyle Ford at Sound Emporium in Nashville; Byron House at Embassy Suits Room 708 in Austin; Brandon Bell at Minutia in Nashville; Sheriff Bob at Sheriff Studios in New York City
Brandon Bell, Joey Crawford, Kyle Ford, Stephen Sharp – assistant engineers
Danny Weiss, Mary Olive Smith, Stephanie Mitterhoff – NYC special assistants
Mastered by Jim DeMain at Yes Master in Nashville
Kristin Wilkinson – string arrangement and contractor for "Heart Temporary"
Stephen Lamb – music preparation for "Heart Temporary"
Photography - Christopher M. Kehoe

Charts

References

Jorma Kaukonen albums
2007 albums
Red House Records albums